The 1995–96 Florida Panthers season was the 3rd season of the franchise that was established in 1993 and their most successful season ever.  In only their third season in the National Hockey League, the Panthers qualified for the playoffs, and won three playoff series to become Eastern Conference champions. In the 1996 Stanley Cup Finals, Florida lost to the Colorado Avalanche in four games. The Panthers would not win another playoff series until 2022.

Offseason

Regular season

Year of the Rat
A very unusual goal celebration developed in Miami. On the night of the Panthers' 1995–96 home opener, a rat scurried across the Florida locker room. Panthers winger Scott Mellanby reacted by "one-timing" the rat against the wall, killing it . That night he scored two goals, which goaltender John Vanbiesbrouck quipped was "a rat trick". Two nights later, as the story found its way into the world, a few fans threw rubber rats on the ice in celebration of a goal. The rubber rat count went from 16 for the third home game to over 2,000 during the playoffs. In an amusing coincidence, 1996 was also year of the Rat according to Chinese astrology.

In the 1996 playoffs, as the fourth seed, the Panthers defeated the Boston Bruins in five games, then upset the top-seeded Philadelphia Flyers in six and the second-seeded Pittsburgh Penguins in seven games to reach the Stanley Cup Final. Their opponents, the Colorado Avalanche, eliminated the Panthers in four games.

Final standings

Schedule and results

Player statistics

Note: Pos = Position; GP = Games played; G = Goals; A = Assists; Pts = Points; +/- = plus/minus; PIM = Penalty minutes; PPG = Power-play goals; SHG = Short-handed goals; GWG = Game-winning goals
      MIN = Minutes played; W = Wins; L = Losses; T = Ties; GA = Goals-against; GAA = Goals-against average; SO = Shutouts; SA = Shots against; SV = Shots saved; SV% = Save percentage;

Playoffs

Eastern Conference Quarterfinals
The fifth-seeded Boston Bruins had one of the best offenses in the Eastern Conference, scoring 282 goals lead by Cam Neely (26 goals) and Adam Oates (25 goals, 67 assists). The Panthers won their first-ever playoff game 6-3 before a sold out Miami Arena, and soon built a 3–0 lead despite being outshot by the Bruins on all games. The Bruins stepped up to win Game 4 with a 6-2 blowout before the Boston crowd. Game 5 was tied 3-3 when with 4:57 left, Bill Lindsay scored with a dive through the air goal while being tripped by star defenseman Ray Bourque, giving the Panthers their first-ever playoff series victory. This was the last year in a record 29 consecutive seasons in the playoffs for the Bruins, as they missed the 1997 post-season.

Eastern Conference semifinals
The Philadelphia Flyers finished atop the Eastern Conference in the regular season with 103 points, led by the high-scoring "Legion of Doom" and the strong goaltending of Garth Snow and Ron Hextall. Philadelphia had just eliminated the other Florida team, the  Tampa Bay Lightning, in 5 games a 2–1 series deficit.

Vanbiesbrouck posted a 2–0 shutout in Game 1, and it took until midway through Game 2 for the Flyers to get rolling offensively in a narrow 3–2 win. Game 3 saw Flyers veterans Dan Quinn, Dale Hawerchuk, Eric Desjardins and Hextall set the tone in a 3–1 victory. With young defenseman Ed Jovanovski tightly covering Flyers superstar Eric Lindros, the Panthers reversed the tide, defeating the Flyers in overtime in Game 4 and double-overtime in Game 5, in what would turn out to be the last Flyers game at the Spectrum. Lindros promised to win game 6 to return the series to Philadelphia, but the Panthers won with a 4–1 score. Florida became the third team to reach the conference finals in their third season – following fellow expansion team New York Islanders in 1975 and the Quebec Nordiques in 1982.

Eastern Conference finals
The 2-seeded Pittsburgh Penguins were energized by the return of Mario Lemieux, who missed the entire 1994–95 season due to injury, and had the league's best offense, scoring 362 goals, and the most wins in the Eastern conference with 49, finishing just one point behind the Flyers. The Penguins advanced to the third round for the first time since 1992, defeating the Washington Capitals in six games and the New York Rangers in five games.

Despite being outshot 33–25 in game one the Panthers came out on top with an impressive 5–1 win, with 32 saves by Vanbiesbrouck and two goals by forward Tom Fitzgerald. The Penguins wanting to avoid going down two games to none against the Panthers came out with a better effort in game two and won the game 3–2 and evened the series at one game each. In game three the Panthers fired an incredible 61 shots on Penguins goaltender Tom Barrasso and it paid off as the Panthers won 5–2 – two goals by Stu Barnes – to take a 2–1 series lead. The Penguins tied game four on Brad Lauer's goal with 11:03 remaining in regulation, and Bryan Smolinski scored with 3:31 to go to give the Penguins a 2–1 lead, tying the series. In game five the Penguins shut out the Panthers 3–0, with Barrasso stopping 28 shots.

Leading the series three games to two Pittsburgh looked to advance to the Stanley Cup Finals in game six. The Penguins led 2–1 in the second period but the Panthers scored three of the next four goals and edged the Penguins 4–3 to tie the series at 3–3. In game seven Florida got a 1–0 lead on Mike Hough's goal at 13:13 of the first period. After a scoreless second period Pittsburgh tied the game on Petr Nedvěd's power-play goal at 1:23 of the third period. The Panthers regained the lead on Tom Fitzgerald's bizarre 58-foot slapshot at 6:18 and got an insurance goal from Johan Garpenlov at 17:23. Florida hung on to win the game 3–1, with a total of 39 saves by Vanbiesbrouck, and closed the series four games to three.

By reaching the finals in only their third season, the Panthers became the fastest expansion team to do so since the St. Louis Blues reached the Stanley Cup finals in their first three seasons. Many Panthers players were managing their first trips to the finals after long careers, such as Vanbiesbrouck (13 years).

Stanley Cup Finals
In the first Stanley Cup Finals where neither team had ever reached the decision before, the Panthers faced the Colorado Avalanche, who were in their inaugural season after relocating from Quebec City.  Led by captain Joe Sakic, forward Peter Forsberg and defenceman Adam Foote, the Avalanche got even stronger once goaltender Patrick Roy joined the team in December 1995. The Avalanche finished the season with a 47–25–10 record for 104 points, won the Pacific Division and finished second in the Western Conference. On their way to the Western title, the Avs beat the Vancouver Canucks, the Chicago Blackhawks and Presidents' Trophy winners Detroit Red Wings, all in six games.

The series started in Denver, and the Avs dominated the Panthers at the McNichols Sports Arena. On game 1, Vanbiesbrouck shut out Colorado for half the game, before three goals were scored in a stretch of 3:49 minutes in the second period, leading to a 3–1 victory. The following game was an 8–1 blowout, starting with three power play goals in the first period as Florida incurred in bad penalties that forced Vanbiesbrouck to be pulled out in favor of Mark Fitzpatrick. Returning to Miami, Game 3 was closer, with Florida scoring twice in the first period. But the Avs still came through, taking over the lead with a Joe Sakic goal early in the second period and holding on to a 3–2 victory.

With their backs to the wall, the Panthers played a defensive game four. Vanbiesbrouck and Roy stood out, combining for 118 saves, and the two teams played a marathon game that took until the third overtime period. Uwe Krupp's unassisted goal at 4:31 ended 44 minutes and 31 seconds of overtime and gave the Avalanche a 1–0 win and a four-games-to-none series win. Goaltender Patrick Roy stopped all 63 shots he faced. Colorado outscored Florida 15–4 in the series, and Patrick Roy stopped 147 of 151 shots, for a save percentage of .974. Joe Sakic was awarded the Conn Smythe Trophy as playoff MVP, having led all skaters in goals with 18, and points with 34. For both Patrick Roy and Claude Lemieux, it was their third Stanley Cup win in eleven years.

Awards and records
 Prince of Wales Trophy
 Ed Jovanovski, defense, NHL All-Rookie Team
 Bryan Murray, NHL Executive of the Year

Transactions

Trades
The Panthers acquired Ray Sheppard from the San Jose Sharks on the trade deadline in 1996.

Draft picks
Florida's draft picks at the 1995 NHL Entry Draft held at the Edmonton Coliseum in Edmonton, Alberta.

References
 Panthers on Hockey Database
 Complete Reference of all things Panther

F
F
Florida Panthers seasons
Eastern Conference (NHL) championship seasons
Fl
Florida Panthers
Florida Panthers